Helgi Valdimarsson (1936–2018) was a professor of immunology at the University of Iceland. He established the first Immunology laboratory of Iceland in 1983. He was a senior lecturer at St Mary's Hospital Medical school, London, England, from 1975 to 1981 and a visiting professor at St. Mary's from 1981 to 1990. He has published over 180 articles in international peer-reviewed journals, and for his work on psoriasis he has received several research grants, including European Commission Grant (1998–2002) and a Fogarty Scholarship in 2003.

He is the father-in-law of English humorist Tim Moore, and the father of Agnar Helgason and Asgeir R. Helgason.

References

 List of scientific articles  on US National Library of Medicine National Institutes of Health

1936 births
Living people
Helgi Valdimarsson
Helgi Valdimarsson
Helgi Valdimarsson